Burton F. Gillett (October 15, 1891 – December 28, 1971) was a director of animated films. He is noted for his Silly Symphonies work for Disney, particularly the 1932 short film Flowers and Trees and the 1933 short film Three Little Pigs, both of which were awarded the Academy Award for Best Animated Short Film and both of which were selected for inclusion in the National Film Registry.

Early life
He was born in Elmira, New York. His animation career started around 1916 when he was employed by the International Film Service, an early animation studio under the ownership of William Randolph Hearst and the supervision of Gregory La Cava. The studio had been formed in 1915 and first employed experienced animators Frank Moser and William Nolan. Within a year the veterans had been joined by several new recruits. Gillett was probably recruited along with notable co-workers John Foster, Jack King, Isadore Klein, Walter Lantz, Grim Natwick, Ben Sharpsteen and Vernon Stallings.

Career

In 1929, Gillett joined the Walt Disney Studio where he started out primarily working on Mickey Mouse cartoon shorts. At this point, Ub Iwerks was the only experienced animator on staff. Walt Disney visited New York City with the goal of hiring more experienced staff. The first notable animator hired this way was Ben Sharpsteen, a veteran of the Fleischer Studios. A visit by Disney to the studio of Pat Sullivan resulted in Disney hiring Gillett, the second New York animator to be hired. He started working for Disney in April, 1929.

The move of the two New Yorkers to the studio coincided with a significant change in the way the staff functioned. Up to 1929, Walt Disney had been the de facto director of most of the studio's films, but now he was pulling back and installing new directors. Gillett soon moved into the "music room" (the director's office). The division of responsibilities between them was still, however, informal and somewhat unclear. Disney did not hesitate to intervene and criticize Gillett in front of fellow staff members.

By the Summer of 1929, Iwerks and Gillett were the primary directors of the studio. Iwerks was directing the Silly Symphonies shorts, and Gillett the Mickey Mouse ones, beginning with Wild Waves. The involvement of Disney himself in production details declined. In 1930, Gillett directed Cannibal Capers, the first of 15 Silly Symphonies shorts to his credit. These included two Academy Award winners (Flowers and Trees and The Three Little Pigs), and also featured important firsts such as the introduction of the Pluto character and the first animated short to be produced in full-color three-strip Technicolor.

Due to the success of The Three Little Pigs, Gillett was recruited to run the Van Beuren Studios in 1934. While working there, he directed the Technicolor Rainbow Parade animated shorts featuring Molly Moo-Cow, Toonerville Folks, and several color Felix the Cat cartoons. He also was the one that hired Joseph Barbera for US$25 a week. In 1934 Gillett shifted the studio production to producing only color cartoon shorts, an innovative step for early animation. The Rainbow Parade shorts imitated the Silly Symphonies, though produced with a lower budget. Tom and Jerry were replaced with newer characters.

Gillett introduced Disney-influenced ideas, and invited young Disney artists to lecture the New York veterans of Van Beuren. However, this was taken as condescension by his artists, and resulted in their resentment. It didn't help that he fired about fifty people in a six-month period, citing as his reason their failure to meet his standards.  Staff morale took a blow. At Van Beuren, Gillett attempted to introduce the rigorous quality standards of Disney, but he did so while maintaining the same working conditions which had plagued the animators of the studio up to that point: low-budget work, and deadlines filled with uncompensated extra work hours. Artists saw their work rejected as substandard, then having to work overtime to replace it. The hard-drinking Gillett gained a reputation for emotional outbursts and instability. As a result of all this, a number of artists initiated contact with the Animated Motion Picture Workers Union (AMPWU), and discussed their plans to join the union, but Gillett had his informants among them.

On February 14, 1935, Gillett called a staff meeting to announce his knowledge of their union talk. He intimidated the artists into changing their plans, though their discontent remained. He later discovered that an inker named Sadie Bodin had encouraged female staff members to stand up to Gillett and refuse to do extra work. He fired her, despite her protest that this violated the recently passed National Labor Relations Act, claiming that he fired her for her attitude rather than her stance in favor of unionizing. On April 17, 1937, Bodin and her husband began picketing outside the studio; for several days they called attention to Gillett firing employees because of their alleged union activity. Unfortunately, her former co-workers were too intimidated to stand by her side.

The AMPWU filed a formal complaint against Van Beuren with the National Labor Relations Board. In his testimony, Gillett claimed that he did not force employees to work for free, but that he had set up a system whereby employees would bank their hours and take the time as paid leave. The board ruled in favor of the studio management. In a subsequent staff meeting, Amadee J. Van Beuren stated his firm support for Gillett, who used his victory to fire other union agitators. Among them was Phil Klein, who was blacklisted by the New York based animation studios, requiring him to move to California to gain employment with the Disney studio.

In 1936, Gillett attempted to revive series focusing on the Toonerville Trolley and Felix the Cat. The failure of both attempts highlighted the weaknesses of his efforts to integrate the West Coast style of Disney with the East Coast style of Van Beuren. These films lacked the energy and imagination of earlier products of the studio, but also lacked the Disney charm, graphic sophistication, and logical storyline.

Van Beuren Studios released its films through a distribution deal with RKO Pictures. In 1936, RKO signed an exclusive distribution deal with the Disney studio, consequently dumping Van Beuren. The ailing animation studio closed, leaving Gillett unemployed. He returned to Disney for a time, then moved to Walter Lantz Productions in 1938, where he directed and wrote cartoons, sometimes using the pseudonym "Gil Burton." Gillett left the animation business in 1940, working at a restaurant by the end of the year.

Personal life
As confirmed by several golden age animators, among them Shamus Culhane, Bill Littlejohn, Izzy Klein, Grim Natwick and Jack Zander, Gillett was mentally unstable. In his autobiography, Culhane speculates that Gillett suffered from bipolar disorder, and notes that he swung from excessive enthusiasm to violent rages to paranoia (once attacking Culhane himself with a spindle when they worked together at Van Beuren's studio), and that he was eventually institutionalized for many years. Culhane's statements have been questioned by historians.

Burt's son Ted Gillett(e) was a noted aircraft designer and ham-radio engineer in Southern California, where his family had moved when his father first worked for Disney.

Filmography

Disney

 Wild Waves (1929)
 Cannibal Capers (1930)
 The Fire Fighters (1930)
 Frolicking Fish (1930)
 Arctic Antics (1930)
 The Shindig (1930)
 The Chain Gang (1930)
 The Gorilla Mystery (1930)
 Monkey Melodies (1930)
 The Picnic (1930)
 Winter (1930)
 Pioneer Days (1930)
 Playful Pan (1930)
 The Birthday Party (1931)
 Birds of a Feather (1931)
 Traffic Troubles (1931)
 Mother Goose Melodies (1931)
 The Moose Hunt (1931)
 The Delivery Boy (1931)
 The Busy Beavers (1931)
 Mickey Steps Out (1931)
 Blue Rhythm (1931)
 Fishin' Around (1931)
 The Barnyard Broadcast (1931)
 The Beach Party (1931)
 Mickey Cuts Up (1931)
 Mickey's Orphans (1931)
 The Duck Hunt (1932)
 The Mad Dog (1932)
 Flowers and Trees (1932)
 Just Dogs (1932)
 Mickey's Nightmare (1932)
 Bugs in Love (1932)
 King Neptune (1932)
 The Wayward Canary (1932)
 Babes in the Woods (1932)
 Mickey's Good Deed (1932)
 Mickey's Pal Pluto (1933)
 Ye Olden Days (1933)
 Three Little Pigs (1933)
 Mickey's Gala Premier (1933)
 The Steeple Chase (1933)
 Giantland (1933)
 Shanghaied (1934)
 Playful Pluto (1934)
 The Big Bad Wolf (1934)
 Gulliver Mickey (1934)
 Orphan's Benefit (1934)
 Mickey Plays Papa (1934)
 Lonesome Ghosts (1937)
 Moth and the Flame (1938)

Van Beuren Studios

 Pastry Town Wedding (1934)
 The Parrotville Fire Department (1934)
 The Sunshine Makers (1935)
 Parrotville Old Folks (1935)
 Japanese Lanterns (1935)
 Spinning Mice (1935)
 A Picnic Panic (1935)
 The Merry Kittens (1935)
 Parrotville Post-Office (1935)
 Rag Dog (1935)
 The Hunting Season (1935)
 Scotty Finds a Home (1935)
 Bird Scouts (1935)
 Molly Moo-Cow and the Butterflies (1935)
 Molly Moo-Cow and the Indians (1935)
 Molly Moo-Cow and Rip Van Winkle (1935)
 Toonerville Trolley (1936)
 Felix the Cat in "The Goose That Laid the Golden Egg (1936)
 Molly Moo-Cow and Robinson Crusoe (1936)
 Neptune Nonsense (1936)
 Bold King Cole (1936)
 Trolley Ahoy (1936)
 Toonerville Picnic (1936)

Metro-Goldwyn-Mayer cartoon studio
 The Winning Ticket (1938)

Walter Lantz

 The Birth of a Toothpick (1939)
 The Stubborn Mule (1939)
 Silly Superstition (1939)
 A Haunting We Will Go (1939)
 The Sleeping Princess (1939)
 Andy Panda Goes Fishing (1940)
 Adventures of Tom Thumb Jr. (1940)

References
 
 
 

Notes

External links
 
 

1891 births
1971 deaths
Animators from New York (state)
American animated film directors
Directors of Best Animated Short Academy Award winners
Fantasy film directors
People from Elmira, New York
Walt Disney Animation Studios people
Walter Lantz Productions people
Film directors from New York (state)